1st class Active State Councillor of the Russian Federation is the highest federal state civilian service rank of Russia. The following list is a list of all persons who was promoted to this rank during the period 2005–2009:

 Oleg Utkin
 Oleg Markov
 Dmitry Peskov
 Sergey Sobyanin
 Oleg Govorun
 Lyubov Glebova
 Ruslan Tatarinov
 Anton Vaino
 Aleksandr Zharov
 Yuriy Chikhanchin
 Evgeny Shkolov
 Vladimir Fridlyanov
 Nikolay Makarov
 Oleg Safonov
 Nikolay Tsvetkov
 Vladimir Osipov
 Vladimir Milovidov
 Anton Siluanov
 Sergey Naryshkin
 Aleksey Sigutkin
 Sergey Vinokurov
 Sergey Komissarov
 Sergey Osipov
 Leonid Reiman
 Pyotr Skorospelov
 Sergey Sobolev
 Vladimir Ustinov
 Andrey Tsybulin
 Konstantin Chuychenko
 Yaroslav Shabanov
 Khazbi Bogov
 Anatoly Perminov
 Mikhail Dmitriev
 Nikolay Vinnichenko
 Larisa Mishustina
 Kirill Androsov
 Nelli Nagoyvzina
 Vladimir Ostrovenko
 Vladislav Putilin
 Alexander Smirnov
 Yuri Ushakov
 Vitaly Shipov
 Tatyana Nesterenko
 Igor Artemyev
 Sergey Maev
 Vyacheslav Beresnev
 Tatyana Kuznetsova
 Nikolay Mikheev
 Svetlana Trubacheva
 Vadim Fadeev
 Ilya Lomakin-Rumyantsev
 Viktor Ishayev
 Aleksey Glagolev
 Vladimir Chernov
 Sergey Mazurenko
 Yury Petrov
 Andrey Dementiev
 Sergey Kruglik
 Maksim Travnikov
 Mikhail Mokretsov
 Yuriy Voronin
 Maxim Topilin
 Mikhail Mikhaylovsky
 Sergey Pchelintsev
 Tatyana Kulkina
 Anastasiya Rakova
 Anatoly Yanovsky
 Yuriy Sharandin

See also
 State civilian and municipal service ranks in Russian Federation

References

Federal state civilian service ranks in the Russian Federation